Le Castelet is a commune in the Calvados department in northwestern France. The municipality was established on 1 January 2019 by merger of the former communes of Garcelles-Secqueville and Saint-Aignan-de-Cramesnil.

See also
Communes of the Calvados department

References

Communes of Calvados (department)